Walter Stark Maurer (May 9, 1893 – May 18, 1983) was an American wrestler who competed in the 1920 Summer Olympics. He was born in Kenosha, Wisconsin and died in Chicago. In 1920, he won the bronze medal in the freestyle wrestling light-heavyweight class after winning the bronze medal match against John Redman.

References

External links
 

1893 births
1983 deaths
Wrestlers at the 1920 Summer Olympics
American male sport wrestlers
Olympic bronze medalists for the United States in wrestling
Medalists at the 1920 Summer Olympics